Chondromodulin-1 is a protein that in humans is encoded by the LECT1 gene.

Function 

This gene encodes a glycosylated transmembrane protein that is cleaved to form a mature, secreted protein. The N-terminus of the precursor protein shares characteristics with other surfactant proteins and is sometimes called chondrosurfactant protein, although no biological activity has yet been defined for it. The C-terminus of the precursor protein contains a 25 kDa mature protein called leukocyte cell-derived chemotaxin-1 or chondromodulin-1. The mature protein promotes chondrocyte growth and inhibits angiogenesis. This gene is expressed in the avascular zone of prehypertrophic cartilage, and its expression decreases during chondrocyte hypertrophy and vascular invasion. The mature protein likely plays a role in endochondral bone development by permitting cartilaginous anlagen to be vascularized and replaced by bone. It may also be involved in the broad control of tissue vascularization during development. Alternative splicing results in multiple transcript variants encoding different isoforms.

Chondromodulin-I, an antiangiogenic factor isolated from cartilage, is abundantly expressed in cardiac valves. Gene targeting of chondromodulin-I resulted in enhanced VEGF-A expression, angiogenesis, lipid deposition and calcification in the cardiac valves of aged mice.

References

Further reading 

 
 
 
 
 
 

Precursor proteins